John "Johnny" Morley (birth unknown – death unknown) was an English professional rugby league footballer who played in the 1900s.

Playing career

International honours
Johnny Morley won a cap for England while at Halifax in 1904 Other Nationalities.

Challenge Cup Final appearances
Johnny Morley played  in Halifax's 7-0 victory over Salford in the 1902–03 Challenge Cup Final during the 1902–03 season at Headingley Rugby Stadium, Leeds on Saturday 25 April 1903, in front of a crowd of 32,507, and he played  in the 8-3 victory over Warrington in the 1903–04 Challenge Cup Final during the 1903–04 season at The Willows, Salford on Saturday 30 April 1904, in front of a crowd of 17,041.

References

External links

England national rugby league team players
English rugby league players
Halifax R.L.F.C. players
Place of birth missing
Place of death missing
Rugby league five-eighths
Rugby league halfbacks
Year of birth missing
Year of death missing